Spring Creek is a tributary of the Knife River, approximately 50 mi (80 km) long, in western North Dakota in the United States.

It rises in the Killdeer Mountains, in Dunn County, and flows east across the prairie country, past Killdeer, Dunn Center, Halliday, and Zap. It joins the Knife near Beulah.

See also
List of North Dakota rivers

External links

Rivers of North Dakota
Rivers of Dunn County, North Dakota
Rivers of Mercer County, North Dakota
Knife River